XHRG-FM is a radio station in Ciudad Acuña, Coahuila, Mexico, broadcasting on 95.5 FM and carrying a regional Mexican format known as La Ley. It is owned by the Ciudad Acuña branch of Saltillo-based Grupo RCG Media.

History
The concession for the station was obtained in 1980.

References

1980 establishments in Mexico
Radio stations established in 1980
Radio stations in Coahuila
Regional Mexican radio stations
Spanish-language radio stations